43 Geo 3 c 58, commonly called Lord Ellenborough's Act and sometimes referred to as the Malicious Shooting Act 1803 or the Malicious Shooting or Stabbing Act 1803, is an Act of the Parliament of the United Kingdom of Great Britain and Ireland.

The Bill was proposed by the Lord Chief Justice of England and Wales, Edward Law, 1st Baron Ellenborough. Lord Ellenborough wished to clarify the law relating to abortion, which, at the time, was not clearly defined in the common law. The bill was introduced in the House of Lords in March 1803 as the Malicious Shootings Bill and also included provisions for clarifying certain other offences. After various amendments it was passed to the House of Commons on 18 May.

The Act provided that it was an offence for any person to perform or cause an abortion. The punishment for performing or attempting to perform a post quickening abortion was the death penalty (section 1) and otherwise was transportation for fourteen years (section 2).

Similar provision was made for Scotland by 6 Geo 4 c 126 (An Act to make provision in Scotland for the further prevention of malicious shooting and attempting to discharge loaded firearms, stabbing, cutting, wounding, poisoning, maiming, disfiguring, and disabling His Majesty's subjects).

See also
 Offences against the Person Act 1861
 Abortion Act 1967
 Human Fertilisation and Embryology Act 1990

Notes

References

External links
Text of Lord Ellenborough's Act in Wikisource.

United Kingdom Acts of Parliament 1803
United Kingdom abortion law
Repealed United Kingdom Acts of Parliament